Jamshid (Jamshēd; Middle- and New Persian: جم, Jam) also known as Yima (Avestan: 𐬫𐬌𐬨𐬀 Yima; Pashto/Dari: یما Yama) is the fourth Shah of the mythological Pishdadian dynasty of Iran according to Shahnameh.

In Persian mythology and folklore, Jamshid is described as the fourth and greatest king of the epigraphically unattested Pishdadian Dynasty (before the Kayanian dynasty). This role is already alluded to in Zoroastrian scripture (e.g. Yasht 19, Vendidad 2), where the figure appears as Yima kshaeta "radiant Yima" and from which the name 'Jamshid' is derived.

Both Jam and Jamshid remain common Iranian and Zoroastrian male names that are also popular in surrounding areas of Iran such as Afghanistan and Tajikistan. Edward FitzGerald transliterated the name as Jamshyd. In the eastern regions of Greater Iran, and by the Zoroastrians of the Indian subcontinent it is rendered as Jamshed.

Etymology
The name Jamshid is originally a compound of two parts, Jam and shid, corresponding to the Avestan names Yima and Xšaēta, derived from the proto-Iranian *Yamah Xšaitah ('Yama, the brilliant/majestic'). Yamah and the related Sanskrit Yama are interpreted as "the twin", perhaps reflecting an Indo-Iranian belief in a primordial Yama and Yami pair. By regular sound changes (y → j, and the loss of the final syllable) an Old Persian form equivalent to Avestan Yima became Middle Persian Jam, which was subsequently continued into New Persian.

There are also a few functional parallels between Avestan Yima and Sanskrit Yama; for instance, Yima was the son of Vivaŋhat, who in turn corresponds to the Vedic Vivasvat, "he who shines out", a name for the sun-god Surya. Both Yamas in Iranian and Indian myth guard Hell with the help of two four-eyed dogs.

Oettinger, when talking about how the story of Yima was originally a flood myth, and how original Sanskrit flood myths had their protagonist as yama, mentions that even the Norse had their own cognate of Yima and Yama, named Ymir, who was a primordial giant whose death caused a great flood and was a basis behind the formation of the world. Ymir was still associated with a flood, as Snorri Sturluson recorded that they believed that the death of Ymir caused a great flood, killing all of the Frost Giants except one named Bergelmir, who floated on some wooden object with his wife and from him the Frost Giants come. The Bergelmir aspect may be due to Christianization. However, the myth still has Ymir connected to a flood. Oettinger's main argument was on how the Indic "Yama" and the Iranic "Yima", both cognates of the Norse "Ymir", also related to the flood.

*Xšaitah meant "bright, shining" or "radiant". By regular sound changes (initial xš → š (sh); ai → ē; t → d between vowels; and dropping of the final syllable) *xšaitah became Persian shēd. In Iranian Persian, the vowel /ē/ is pronounced as /i/. Consequently, Jamshēd (as it is still pronounced in Afghanistan and Tajikistan) is now pronounced Jamshid in Iran. The suffix -shid is the same as that found in other names such as khorshid ("the Sun" from Avestan hvarə-xšaēta "radiant Sun").

The modern Turkish name Cem is derived from Persian Jam.

One contributor has posited that Persian jam is the root of Arabic ajam, assuming that this Arabic word for the Persian-speaking population was derived from a Persian endonym, meaning the people of Jam. However, this is incorrect. ʿAjam comes from the Arabic root ʿ(ʿayn) ج (jim) م (mim), meaning to speak incomprehensibly, and was used among Arabs, initially, for all peoples who spoke languages that were incomprehensible to Arabic speakers, whether they spoke Persian, Fulani, or a Turkic language. Later, Arabs used this word as a derogatory term for Persian speakers to distinguish them from Arabic speakers. The word ʿajam or ʿajami is still used in other parts of the Islamic world to denote languages other than Arabic, particularly in the Saharan and sub-Saharan regions.

In scripture
Source:

In the second chapter of the Vendidad of the Avesta, the omniscient Creator Ahura Mazda asks Yima, a good shepherd, to receive his law and bring it to men. However, Yima refuses, and so Ahura Mazda charges him with a different mission: to rule over and nourish the earth, to see that the living things prosper. This Yima accepts, and Ahura Mazda presents him with a golden seal and a dagger inlaid with gold.

Yima rules as king for three hundred years, and soon the earth was full of men, flocks of birds and herds of animals. He deprived the daevas, who were demonic servants of the evil Ahriman, of wealth, herds and reputation during his reign.  Good men, however, lived lives of plenty, and were neither sick nor aged. Father and son walked together, each appearing no older than fifteen.  Ahura Mazda visits him once more, warning him of this overpopulation. Yima, shining with light, faced southwards and pressed the golden seal against the earth and boring into it with the poniard, says "O Spenta Armaiti, kindly open asunder and stretch thyself afar, to bear flocks and herds and men."

The earth swells and Yima rules for another six hundred years before the same problem occurred once more. Once again he pressed the seal and dagger to the earth and asked the ground to swell up to bear more men and beasts, and the earth swells again. Nine hundred years later, the earth was full again. The same solution is employed, the earth swelling again.

The next part of the story tells of a meeting of Ahura Mazda and the Yazatas in Airyanem Vaejah, the first of the "perfect lands". Yima attends with a group of "the best of mortals", where Ahura Mazda warns him of an upcoming catastrophe: "O fair Yima, son of Vivaŋhat! Upon the material world the evil winters are about to fall, that shall bring the fierce, deadly frost; upon the material world the evil winters are about to fall, that shall make snow-flakes fall thick, even an arədvi deep on the highest tops of mountains."

The Vedivdad mentions that Ahura Mazda warns Yima that there will come a harsh winter storm followed by melted snow. Ahura Mazda advises Yima to construct a Vara (Avestan: enclosure) in the form of a multi-level cavern, two miles (3 km) long and two miles (3 km) wide. This he is to populate with the fittest of men and women; and with two of every animal, bird and plant; and supply with food and water gathered the previous summer. Yima creates the Vara by crushing the earth with a stamp of his foot, and kneading it into shape as a potter does clay. He creates streets and buildings, and brings nearly two thousand people to live therein. He creates artificial light, and finally seals the Vara with a golden ring.

Henry Corbin interprets this story as a spiritual event and describes it as follows: Yima "received the order to build the enclosure, the Var, where were gathered together the elect from among all beings, the fairest, the most gracious, that they might be preserved from the mortal winter unleashed by the demonic Powers, and some day repopulate a transfigured world. Indeed, the Var of Yima is, as it were, a city, including houses, storehouses, and ramparts. It has luminescent doors and windows that themselves secrete the light within, for it is illuminated both by uncreated and created lights."

Norbert Oettinger argues that the story of Yima and the Vara was originally a flood myth, and the harsh winter was added in due to the dry nature of Eastern Iran, as flood myths didn't have as much of an effect as harsh winters. He has argued that the Videvdad 2.24's mention of melted water flowing is a remnant of the flood myth.

In tradition and folklore

 

Over time, the Avestan hero Yima Xšaēta became the world-ruling Shāh Jamshid of Persian legend and mythology.

According to the Shāhnāma of the poet Firdausī, Jamshid was the fourth king of the world. He had command over all the angels and demons of the world, and was both king and high priest of Hormozd (middle Persian for Ahura Mazda). He was responsible for a great many inventions that made life more secure for his people: the manufacture of armor and weapons, the weaving and dyeing of clothes of linen, silk and wool, the building of houses of brick, the mining of jewels and precious metals, the making of perfumes and wine, the art of medicine, the navigation of the waters of the world in sailing ships. The sudreh and kushti of the Zoroastrianism are also attributed to Jamshid. Traditional mythology also credits him with the invention of music. From the skin-clad followers of Keyumars, humanity had risen to a great civilization in Jamshid's time.

Jamshid also divided the people into four groups:

 Kātouzians: The priests who conducted the worship of Hormozd
 Neysārians: The warriors who protected the people by the might of their arms
 Nāsoudians: The farmers who grew the grain that fed the people
 Hotokhoshians: The artisans, who produced goods for the ease and enjoyment of the people

Jamshid had now become the greatest monarch the world had ever known. He was endowed with the royal farr (Avestan: khvarena), a radiant splendor that burned about him by divine favor. One day he sat upon a jewel-studded throne and the divs who served him raised his throne up into the air and he flew through the sky. His subjects, all the peoples of the world, marvelled and praised him. On this day, which was the first of the month of Farvardin, they first celebrated the holiday of Nawrōz ("new day"). In the variant of the Zoroastrian calendar followed by the Zoroastrians of India, the first day of the month of Farvardin is still called Jamshēd-i Nawrōz.

Jamshid was said to have had a magical seven-ringed cup, the Jām-e Jam which was filled with the elixir of immortality and allowed him to observe the universe.

Jamshid's capital was erroneously believed to be at the site of the ruins of Persepolis, which for centuries (down to 1620 CE) was called Takht-i Jamshēd, the "Throne of Jamshid".
However, Persepolis was actually the capital of the Achaemenid kings and was destroyed by Alexander. Similarly, the sculptured tombs of the Achaemenids and Sāsānians near Persepolis were believed to be images of the legendary hero Rostam, and so were called Naqsh-e Rustam.

Jamshid ruled well for three hundred years. During this time longevity increased, sicknesses were banished, and peace and prosperity reigned. But Jamshid's pride grew with his power, and he began to forget that all the blessings of his reign were due to God. He boasted to his people that all of the good things they had come from him alone, and demanded that he should be accorded divine honors, as if he were the Creator.

From this time the farr departed from Jamshid, and the people began to murmur and rebel against him. Jamshid repented in his heart, but his glory never returned to him. The vassal ruler of Arabia, Zahhāk, under the influence of Ahriman, made war upon Jamshid, and he was welcomed by many of Jamshid's dissatisfied subjects. Jamshid fled from his capital halfway across the world, but he was finally trapped by Zahhāk and brutally murdered. After a reign of seven hundred years, humanity descended from the heights of civilization back into a Dark Age.

Legend of the discovery of wine
King Jamshid is featured prominently in one apocryphal tale associated with the history of wine and its discovery. According to Persian legend, the king banished one of his harem ladies from his kingdom, causing her to become despondent and wishing to commit suicide. Going to the king's warehouse, the girl sought out a jar marked "poison" which contained the remnants of grapes that had spoiled and were deemed undrinkable. Unbeknownst to her, the "spoilage" was actually the result of fermentation caused by the breakdown of the grapes by yeast into alcohol. After drinking the so-called poison, the harem girl discovered its effects to be pleasant and her spirits were lifted. She took her discovery to the king, who became so enamored with this new "wine" beverage that he not only accepted the girl back into his harem but also decreed that all grapes grown in Persepolis would be devoted to winemaking. While most wine historians view this story as pure legend, there is archaeological evidence that wine was known and extensively traded by the early Persian kings.

See also
 Arnavāz
 Yama—Hindu god

References

Further reading
 2nd Fargard of James Darmesteter's translation of the Vendidad
 The Heroic Age of Persia

External links

A king's book of kings: the Shah-nameh of Shah Tahmasp, an exhibition catalog from The Metropolitan Museum of Art (fully available online as PDF), which contains material on Jamshid

Longevity myths
Zoroastrianism
Mythological kings
Pishdadian dynasty
Ymir